

Events

Pre-1600
1199 – King Richard I of England is wounded by a crossbow bolt while fighting in France, leading to his death on April 6.
1387 – English victory over a Franco-Castilian-Flemish fleet in the Battle of Margate off the coast of Margate.
1401 – Turco-Mongol emperor Timur sacks Damascus.

1601–1900
1603 – James VI of Scotland is proclaimed King James I of England and Ireland, upon the death of Elizabeth I.
  1603   – Tokugawa Ieyasu is granted the title of shōgun from Emperor Go-Yōzei, and establishes the Tokugawa shogunate in Edo, Japan.
1663 – The Province of Carolina is granted by charter to eight Lords Proprietor in reward for their assistance in restoring Charles II of England to the throne.
1720 – Count Frederick of Hesse-Kassel is elected King of Sweden by the Riksdag of the Estates, after his consort Ulrika Eleonora abdicated the throne on 29 February.
1721 – Johann Sebastian Bach dedicated six concertos to Margrave Christian Ludwig of Brandenburg-Schwedt, now commonly called the Brandenburg Concertos, BWV 1046–1051.
1765 – Great Britain passes the Quartering Act, which requires the Thirteen Colonies to house British troops.
1794 – In Kraków, Tadeusz Kościuszko announces a general uprising against Imperial Russia and the Kingdom of Prussia, and assumes the powers of the Commander in Chief of all of the Polish forces.
1829 – The Parliament of the United Kingdom passes the Roman Catholic Relief Act 1829, allowing Catholics to serve in Parliament.
1832 – In Hiram, Ohio, a group of men beat and tar and feather Mormon leader Joseph Smith.
1854 – President José Gregorio Monagas abolishes slavery in Venezuela.
1860 – Sakuradamon Incident: Japanese Chief Minister (Tairō) Ii Naosuke is assassinated by rōnin samurai outside the Sakurada Gate of Edo Castle.
1869 – The last of Titokowaru's forces surrendered to the New Zealand government, ending his uprising.
1870 – a Chilean prospecting party led by José Díaz Gana discovers the silver ores of Caracoles in the Bolivian portion of Atacama Desert,  leading to the last of Chilean silver rushes and a diplomatic dispute over its taxation between Chile and Bolivia.
1878 – The British frigate  sinks, killing more than 300.
1882 – Robert Koch announces the discovery of Mycobacterium tuberculosis, the bacterium responsible for tuberculosis.
1900 – Mayor of New York City Robert Anderson Van Wyck breaks ground for a new underground "Rapid Transit Railroad" that would link Manhattan and Brooklyn.
1900 – Carnegie Steel Company is formed in New Jersey; its capitalization of $160 mil. is the largest to date.

1901–present
1921 – The 1921 Women's Olympiad began in Monte Carlo, becoming the first international women's sports event.
1927 – Nanking Incident: Foreign warships bombard Nanjing, China, in defense of the foreign citizens within the city.
1934 – The Tydings–McDuffie Act is passed by the United States Congress, allowing the Philippines to become a self-governing commonwealth.
1944 – German troops massacre 335 Italian civilians in Rome.
  1944   – World War II: In an event later dramatized in the movie The Great Escape, 76 Allied prisoners of war begin breaking out of the German camp Stalag Luft III.
1946 – A British Cabinet Mission arrives in India to discuss and plan for the transfer of power from the British Raj to Indian leadership.
1949 – Hanns Albin Rauter, a chief SS and Police Leader, in the Netherlands, is convicted and executed for crimes against humanity.
1961 – The Quebec Board of the French Language is established.
1972 – Direct rule is imposed on Northern Ireland by the Government of the United Kingdom under Edward Heath.
1976 – In Argentina, the armed forces overthrow the constitutional government of President Isabel Perón and start a 7-year dictatorial period self-styled the National Reorganization Process.
1977 – Morarji Desai became the Prime Minister of India, the first Prime Minister not to belong to Indian National Congress.
1980 – El Salvadorian Archbishop Óscar Romero is assassinated while celebrating Mass in San Salvador.
1982 – Bangladeshi President Abdus Sattar is deposed in a bloodless coup led by Army Chief Lieutenant general Hussain Muhammad Ershad, who suspends the Constitution and imposes martial law.
1986 – The Loscoe gas explosion leads to new UK laws on landfill gas migration and gas protection on landfill sites.
1989 – In Prince William Sound in Alaska, the Exxon Valdez spills  of crude oil after running aground.
1990 – Indian intervention in the Sri Lankan Civil War ends with last ship of Indian Peace Keeping Force leaving Sri Lanka.
1993 – Comet Shoemaker–Levy 9 is discovered by Carolyn and Eugene Shoemaker, and David Levy at the Palomar Observatory in California.
1998 – Mitchell Johnson and Andrew Golden, aged 11 and 13 respectively, fire upon teachers and students at Westside Middle School in Jonesboro, Arkansas; five people are killed and ten are wounded.
  1998   – A tornado sweeps through Dantan in India, killing 250 people and injuring 3,000 others.
  1998   – Dr. Rüdiger Marmulla performed the first computer-assisted Bone Segment Navigation at the University of Regensburg, Germany.
1999 – Kosovo War: NATO began attacks on Yugoslavia without United Nations Security Council (UNSC) approval, marking the first time NATO has attacked a sovereign country.
  1999 – A lorry carrying margarine and flour catches fire inside the Mont Blanc Tunnel, creating an inferno that kills 38 people.
2003 – The Arab League votes 21–1 in favor of a resolution demanding an end to the 2003 invasion of Iraq.
2008 – Bhutan officially becomes a democracy, with its first ever general election.
2015 – Germanwings Flight 9525 crashes in the French Alps in an apparent pilot mass murder-suicide, killing all 150 people on board.
2018 – Syrian civil war: The Turkish Armed Forces (TAF) and Syrian National Army (SNA) take full control of Afrin District, marking the end of the Afrin offensive.
  2018   – Students across the United States stage the March for Our Lives demanding gun control in response to the Stoneman Douglas High School shooting. 
2019 – Jakarta MRT, a rapid transit system in Jakarta, began operation.

Births

Pre-1600
1103 – Yue Fei, Chinese military general (d. 1142)
1441 – Ernest, Elector of Saxony, German ruler of Saxony (d. 1486)
1494 – Georgius Agricola, German mineralogist and scholar (d. 1555)
1577 – Francis, Duke of Pomerania-Stettin, Bishop of Cammin (d. 1620)

1601–1900
1607 – Michiel de Ruyter, Dutch admiral (d. 1667)
1628 – Sophie Amalie of Brunswick-Lüneburg (d. 1685)
1657 – Arai Hakuseki, Japanese academic and politician (d. 1725)
1693 – John Harrison, English carpenter and clock-maker, invented the Marine chronometer (d. 1776)
1725 – Samuel Ashe, American lawyer and politician, 9th Governor of North Carolina (d. 1813)
  1725   – Thomas Cushing, American lawyer and politician, 1st Lieutenant Governor of Massachusetts (d. 1788)
1755 – Rufus King, American lawyer and politician, United States Ambassador to the United Kingdom (d. 1827)
1762 – Marcos Portugal, Portuguese organist and composer (d. 1830)
1775 – Muthuswami Dikshitar, Indian poet and composer (d. 1835)
1782 – Orest Kiprensky, Russian-Italian painter (d. 1836)
1796 – Zulma Carraud, French author (d. 1889)
  1796   – John Corry Wilson Daly, Canadian businessman and politician (d. 1878)
1803 – Egerton Ryerson, Canadian minister, educator, and politician (d. 1882)
1808 – Maria Malibran, Spanish-French soprano (d. 1836)
1809 – Mariano José de Larra, Spanish journalist and author (d. 1837)
  1809   – Joseph Liouville, French mathematician and academic (d. 1882)
1816 – Pelagio Antonio de Labastida y Dávalos, Mexican politician and Roman Catholic archbishop, regent during the Second Mexican Empire (d. 1891) 
1820 – Edmond Becquerel, French physicist and academic (d. 1891)
  1820   – Fanny Crosby, American poet and composer (d. 1915)
1823 – Thomas Spencer Baynes, English philosopher and critic (d. 1887)
1826 – Matilda Joslyn Gage, American activist and author (d. 1898)
1828 – Horace Gray, American lawyer and jurist (d. 1902)
1829 – George Francis Train, American businessman (d. 1904)
  1829   – Ignacio Zaragoza, Mexican general (d. 1862)
1830 – Robert Hamerling, Austrian poet and playwright (d. 1889)
1834 – William Morris, English textile designer, poet, and author (d. 1896)
  1834   – John Wesley Powell, American soldier, geologist, and explorer (d. 1902)
1835 – Joseph Stefan, Austrian physicist, mathematician, and poet (d. 1893)
1848 – Honoré Beaugrand, Canadian journalist and politician, 18th Mayor of Montreal (d. 1906)
1850 – Silas Hocking, English minister and author (d. 1935)
1854 – Henry Lefroy, Australian politician, 11th Premier of Western Australia (d. 1930)
1855 – Andrew W. Mellon, American banker, financier, and diplomat, 49th United States Secretary of the Treasury (d. 1937)
  1855   – Olive Schreiner, South African author and activist (d. 1920)
1862 – Frank Weston Benson, American painter and educator (d. 1951)
1869 – Émile Fabre, French author and playwright (d. 1955)
1871 – Alec Hurley, English music hall singer (d. 1913)
1874 – Luigi Einaudi, Italian economist and politician, 2nd President of the Italian Republic (d. 1961)
  1874   – Harry Houdini, Hungarian-Jewish American magician and actor (d. 1926)
1875 – William Burns, Canadian lacrosse player (d. 1953)
1879 – Neyzen Tevfik, Turkish philosopher, poet, and composer (d. 1953)
1882 – Marcel Lalu, French gymnast (d. 1951)
  1882   – George Monckton-Arundell, 8th Viscount Galway, English politician, 5th Governor-General of New Zealand (d. 1943)
1883 – Dorothy Campbell, Scottish-American golfer (d. 1945)
1884 – Peter Debye, Dutch-American physicist and chemist, Nobel Prize laureate (d. 1966)
  1884   – Chika Kuroda, Japanese chemist (d. 1968)
  1884   – Eugène Tisserant, French cardinal (d. 1972)
1885 – Charles Daniels, American swimmer (d. 1973)
  1885   – Dimitrie Cuclin, Romanian violinist and composer (d. 1978)
1886 – Edward Weston, American photographer (d. 1958)
  1886   – Robert Mallet-Stevens, French architect and designer (d. 1945)
1887 – Roscoe Arbuckle, American actor, director, and screenwriter (d. 1933)
1888 – Viktor Kingissepp, Estonian politician (d. 1922)
1889 – Albert Hill, English-Canadian runner (d. 1969)
1890 – Agnes Macphail, Canadian educator and politician (d. 1954)
1891 – Sergey Ivanovich Vavilov, Russian physicist and academic (d. 1951)
1892 – Marston Morse, American mathematician and academic (d. 1977)
1893 – Walter Baade, German astronomer and author (d. 1960)
  1893  – George Sisler, American baseball player and scout (d. 1973)
1897 – Wilhelm Reich, Austrian-American psychotherapist and academic (d. 1957)

1901–present
1901 – Ub Iwerks, American animator, director, and producer, co-created Mickey Mouse (d. 1971)
1902 – Thomas E. Dewey, American lawyer and politician, 47th Governor of New York (d. 1971)
1903 – Adolf Butenandt, German biochemist and academic, Nobel Prize laureate (d. 1995)
  1903   – Malcolm Muggeridge, English journalist, author, and scholar (d. 1990)
1905 – Pura Santillan-Castrence, Filipino author and diplomat (d. 2007)
1907 – Paul Sauvé, Canadian lawyer and politician, 17th Premier of Quebec (d. 1960)
1909 – Clyde Barrow, American criminal (d. 1934)
1909 – Richard Wurmbrand, Romanian pastor and evangelist (d. 2001)
1910 – Richard Conte, American actor, singer, and director (d. 1975)
1911 – Joseph Barbera, American animator, director, and producer, co-founded Hanna-Barbera (d. 2006)
1912 – Dorothy Height, American educator and activist (d. 2010)
1915 – Eugène Martin, French racing driver (d. 2006)
1916 – Donald Hamilton, Swedish-American soldier and author (d. 2006)
  1916   – Harry B. Whittington, English palaeontologist and academic (d. 2010)
1917 – Constantine Andreou, Greek painter and sculptor (d. 2007) 
  1917   – John Kendrew, English biochemist and crystallographer, Nobel Prize laureate (d. 1997)
1919 – Lawrence Ferlinghetti, American poet and publisher, co-founded City Lights Bookstore (d. 2021)
  1919   – Robert Heilbroner, American economist and historian (d. 2005)
1920 – Gene Nelson, American actor, director, and screenwriter (d. 1996)
  1920   – Mary Stolz, American author (d. 2006)
1921 – Franciszek Blachnicki, Polish priest (d. 1987)
  1921   – Vasily Smyslov, Russian chess player (d. 2010)
1922 – Onna White, Canadian dancer and choreographer (d. 2005)
1923 – Murray Hamilton, American actor (d. 1986)
  1923   – Michael Legat, English author and publisher (d. 2011)
1924 – Norman Fell, American actor (d. 1998)
1925 – Puig Aubert, German-French rugby league player and coach (d. 1994)
1926 – Desmond Connell, Irish cardinal (d. 2017)
  1926   – Dario Fo, Italian playwright, actor, director, and composer, Nobel Prize laureate (d. 2016)
  1926   – William Porter, American hurdler (d. 2000)
1927 – John Woodland Hastings, American biochemist and academic (d. 2014)
  1927   – Martin Walser, German author and playwright
1928 – Byron Janis, American pianist and composer
1929 – Pat Renella, Italian-American actor (d. 2012)
1930 – David Dacko, Central African politician, 1st President of the Central African Republic (d. 2003)
  1930   – Steve McQueen, American actor and producer (d. 1980)
1931 – Hanno Drechsler, German educator and politician, Mayor of Marburg (d. 2003)
1933 – Stephen De Staebler, American sculptor and educator (d. 2011)
  1933   – Lee Mendelson, American television producer (d. 2019)
1936 – Don Covay, American singer-songwriter (d. 2015)
  1936   – Alex Olmedo, Peruvian-American tennis player (d. 2020)
1937 – Billy Stewart, American singer and pianist (d. 1970)
1938 – David Irving, English historian and author
  1938   – Larry Wilson, American football player (d. 2020)
1940 – Bob Mackie, American fashion designer
1941 – Michael Masser, American songwriter, composer and producer (d. 2015)
1942 – Jesús Alou, Dominican baseball player (d. 2023)
1944 – R. Lee Ermey, American sergeant and actor (d. 2018)
  1944   – Vojislav Koštunica, Serbian academic and politician, 8th Prime Minister of Serbia
1945 – Robert T. Bakker, American paleontologist and academic
  1945   – Curtis Hanson, American director, producer, and screenwriter (d. 2016)
  1945   – Patrick Malahide, English actor and screenwriter
1946 – Klaus Dinger, German guitarist and songwriter (d. 2008)
  1946   – Kitty O'Neil, American stuntwoman (d. 2018)
1947 – Dennis Erickson, American football player and coach
  1947   – Christine Gregoire, American lawyer and politician, 22nd Governor of Washington
  1947   – Mick Jones, English footballer and coach
  1947   – Alan Sugar, English businessman
1948 – Javier Diez Canseco, Peruvian sociologist and politician (d. 2013)
  1948   – Jerzy Kukuczka, Polish mountaineer (d. 1989)
  1948   – Lee Oskar, Danish musician
1949 – Tabitha King, American author and poet
  1949   – Ruud Krol, Dutch footballer and coach
  1949   – Steve Lang, Canadian bass player (d. 2017)
  1949   – Nick Lowe, English singer-songwriter, bass player, and producer 
  1949   – Ali Akbar Salehi, Iranian academic and politician, 36th Foreign Affairs Minister of Iran
  1949   – Ranil Wickremesinghe, Sri Lankan lawyer and politician, 13th Prime Minister of Sri Lanka
1950 – Gary Wichard, American football player and agent (d. 2011)
1951 – Peter Boyle, Scottish-Australian footballer and manager (d. 2013)
  1951   – Pat Bradley, American golfer
  1951   – Tommy Hilfiger, American fashion designer, founded the Tommy Hilfiger Corporation
  1951   – Dougie Thomson, Scottish bass player
  1951   – Anna Włodarczyk, Polish long jumper and coach
1952 – Greg McCrary, American football player (d. 2013)
1953 – Anita L. Allen, American lawyer, philosopher, and academic
  1953   – Louie Anderson, American actor and comedian (d. 2022)
1954 – Rafael Orozco Maestre, Colombian singer (d. 1992)
1955 – Doug Jarvis, Canadian ice hockey player and coach
  1955   – Pat Price, Canadian ice hockey player and coach
1956 – Steve Ballmer, American businessman
  1956   – Bill Wray, American cartoonist and painter
1957 – Pierre Harvey, Canadian cyclist and skier
  1957   – Pat Jarvis, Australian rugby league player
1958 – Mike Woodson, American basketball player and coach
1959 – Emmit King, American sprinter
  1959   – Renaldo Nehemiah, American hurdler and football player
  1959   – Derek Statham, English footballer
1960 – Jan Berglin, Swedish cartoonist
  1960   – Barry Horowitz, American wrestler
  1960   – Kelly Le Brock, English-American actress and model
  1960   – Nena, German singer-songwriter and actress
  1960   – Scott Pruett, American race car driver
  1960   – Annabella Sciorra, American actress 
1961 – Dean Jones, Australian cricketer and coach (d. 2020)
  1961   – Yanis Varoufakis, Greek economist and politician, Greek Minister of Finance
1962 – Angèle Dubeau, Canadian violinist
  1962   – Star Jones, American lawyer, journalist, and talk show host
  1962   – Irina Meszynski, German discus thrower
1963 – Raimond van der Gouw, Dutch footballer and coach
  1963   – Vadym Tyshchenko, Ukrainian footballer and manager (d. 2015)
  1963   – Torsten Voss, German decathlete and bobsledder
1965 – The Undertaker, American wrestler and actor
1966 – Floyd Heard, American sprinter and coach
  1966   – Rico Hizon,  Filipino broadcast journalist
1967 – Diann Roffe, American skier
1968 – Minarti Timur, Indonesian badminton player
1969 –  Ilir Meta, Albanian politician, incumbent President of Albania
1969 – S.S. Sivasankar, Indian Tamil politician, incumbent Minister for Transport, Tamil Nadu
1969 – Stephan Eberharter, Austrian skier
1970 – Lara Flynn Boyle, American actress 
  1970   – Sharon Corr, Irish singer-songwriter and violinist 
  1970   – Judith Draxler, Austrian swimmer
  1970   – Erica Kennedy, American journalist and author (d. 2012)
  1970   – Mike Vanderjagt, Canadian-American football player
1971 – Tig Notaro, American comedian and actor
1972 – Christophe Dugarry, French footballer
  1972   – Steve Karsay, American baseball player and coach
1973 – Jacek Bąk, Polish footballer
  1973   – Philippe Boucher, Canadian ice hockey player and manager
  1973   – Steve Corica, Australian footballer and coach
  1973   – Jure Ivanušič, Slovenian actor, concert pianist and chansonnier
  1973   – Mette Jacobsen, Danish swimmer
  1973   – Glen Jakovich, Australian footballer
  1973   – Jim Parsons, American actor
1974 – Alyson Hannigan, American actress
  1974   – Sergey Klyugin, Russian high jumper
  1974   – Tado, Filipino comedian and activist (d. 2014)
1975 – Thomas Johansson, Swedish-Monacan tennis player
1976 – Aaron Brooks, American football player
  1976   – Aliou Cissé, Senegalese footballer and coach
  1976   – Athanasios Kostoulas, Greek footballer
  1976   – Peyton Manning, American football player and entrepreneur
1977 – Jessica Chastain, American actress 
  1977   – Maxim Kuznetsov, Russian ice hockey player
  1977   – Darren Lockyer, Australian rugby league player and sportscaster
1978 – Michael Braun, Australian footballer and coach
  1978   – Tomáš Ujfaluši, Czech footballer and manager
  1978   – José Valverde, Dominican baseball player
1979 – Lake Bell, American actress, director, and screenwriter
  1979   – Norris Hopper, American baseball player
  1979   – Periklis Iakovakis, Greek hurdler
  1979   – Graeme Swann, English cricketer
1980 – Tassos Venetis, Greek footballer
1981 – Mike Adams, American football player
  1981   – Ron Hainsey, American ice hockey player
  1981   – Dirk Hayhurst, American baseball player
  1981   – Mark Looms, Dutch footballer
  1981   – Gary Paffett, English racing driver
1982 – Corey Hart, American baseball player
  1982   – Jack Swagger, American mixed martial artist and professional wrestler
  1982   – Epico Colon, Puerto Rican professional wrestler
  1982   – Jimmy Hempte, Belgian footballer
  1982   – Dustin McGowan, American baseball player
1983 – Luca Ceccarelli, Italian footballer
  1983   – Riccardo Musetti, Italian footballer
  1983   – Pierre-Alexandre Parenteau, Canadian ice hockey player
  1983   – T.J. Ford, American basketball player
1984 – Benoît Assou-Ekotto, French-born Cameroonian international footballer
  1984   – Chris Bosh, American basketball player
  1984   – Adrian D'Souza, Indian field hockey player
  1984   – Lucy Wangui Kabuu, Kenyan runner
  1984   – Park Bom, South Korean singer 
  1984   – Philipp Petzschner, German tennis player
1985 – Lana, American wrestler and manager
  1985   – Haruka Ayase, Japanese actress and singer
1987 – Ramires, Brazilian footballer
  1987   – Shakib Al Hasan, Bangladeshi cricketer
  1987   – Billy Jones, English footballer
  1987   – Yuma Asami, Japanese actress and singer
1988 – Aiga Grabuste, Latvian heptathlete
  1988   – Ryan Higgins, Zimbabwean cricketer
  1988   – Matías Martínez, Argentinian footballer
  1988   – Kardo Ploomipuu, Estonian swimmer
  1988   – Matt Todd, New Zealand rugby union player
  1989   – Aziz Shavershian, Russian-born Australian bodybuilder (d. 2011)
1990 – Starlin Castro, American baseball player
  1990   – Aljur Abrenica, Filipino actor
  1990   – Keisha Castle-Hughes, Australian-New Zealand actress
  1990   – Lacey Evans, American wrestler
  1990   – Alyssa Healy, Australian cricketer
1991 – Nick Browne, English cricketer
  1991  – Dalila Jakupovic, Slovenian tennis player
1995 – Enzo Zidane, French-Spanish footballer
1997 – Mina Myōi, Japanese singer and dancer
1998 – Damar Hamlin, American football player
1999 – Katie Swan, British tennis player
2001 – Clara Burel, French tennis player

Deaths

Pre-1600
 809 – Harun al-Rashid, Arab caliph (b. 763)
 832 – Wulfred, archbishop of Canterbury
1284 – Hugh III of Cyprus (b. 1235)
1296 – Odon de Pins, Grand Master of the Knights Hospitaller
1381 – Catherine of Vadstena, Swedish saint (b. 1332)
1394 – Constance of Castile, claimant to the throne of Castile
1396 – Walter Hilton, English mystic and saint (b. 1340)
1399 – Margaret, Duchess of Norfolk (b.c. 1320)
1443 – James Douglas, 7th Earl of Douglas (b. 1371)
1455 – Pope Nicholas V (b. 1397)
1499 – Edward Stafford, 2nd Earl of Wiltshire, English nobleman (b. 1470)
1563 – Hosokawa Harumoto, Japanese daimyō (b. 1514)
1575 – Joseph ben Ephraim Karo, Spanish-Portuguese rabbi and author (b. 1488)

1601–1900
1603 – Elizabeth I of England (b. 1533)
1653 – Samuel Scheidt, German organist and composer (b. 1587)
1684 – Pieter de Hooch, Dutch painter (b. 1629)
  1684   – Elizabeth Ridgeway, English woman convicted of poisoning her husband
1773 – Philip Stanhope, 4th Earl of Chesterfield, English politician, Captain of the Yeomen of the Guard (b. 1694)
1776 – John Harrison, English carpenter and clockmaker, invented the Marine chronometer (b. 1693)
1824 – Louis Marie de La Révellière-Lépeaux, French lawyer (b. 1753)
1838 – Abraham Hume, English floriculturist and Tory politician (b. 1748/49)
1866 – Maria Amalia of Naples and Sicily, Queen of France (b. 1782)
1869 – Antoine-Henri Jomini, French-Russian general (b. 1779)
1881 – Achille Ernest Oscar Joseph Delesse, French geologist and mineralogist (b. 1817)
1882 – Henry Wadsworth Longfellow, American poet and educator (b. 1807)
1887 – Ivan Kramskoi, Russian painter and critic (b. 1837)
1888 – Vsevolod Garshin, Russian author (b. 1855)

1901–present
1905 – Jules Verne, French novelist, poet, and playwright (b. 1828)
1909 – John Millington Synge, Irish playwright and poet (b. 1871)
1915 – Margaret Lindsay Huggins, Anglo-Irish astronomer (b. 1848)
  1915   – Karol Olszewski, Polish chemist, mathematician, and physicist (b. 1846)
1916 – Enrique Granados, Spanish pianist and composer (b. 1867)
1926 – Phan Châu Trinh, Vietnamese activist (b. 1872)
1932 – Frantz Reichel, French rugby player and hurdler (b. 1871)
1938 – Yondonwangchug, Mongolian politician (b. 1870)
1940 – Édouard Branly, French physicist and academic (b. 1844)
1944 – Orde Wingate, Indian-English general (b. 1903)
1946 – Alexander Alekhine, Russian chess player (b. 1892)
  1946   – Carl Schuhmann, German gymnast, shot putter, and jumper (b. 1869)
1948 – Sigrid Hjertén, Swedish painter and illustrator (b. 1885)
1950 – James Rudolph Garfield, American lawyer and politician, 23rd United States Secretary of the Interior (b. 1865)
1951 – Lorna Hodgkinson, Australian educator and educational psychologist (b. 1887)
1953 – Mary of Teck (b. 1867)
1956 – E. T. Whittaker, British mathematician and physicist (b. 1873)
1962 – Jean Goldkette, French-American pianist and bandleader (b. 1899)
  1962   – Auguste Piccard, Swiss physicist and explorer (b. 1884)
1968 – Alice Guy-Blaché, American director, producer, and screenwriter (b. 1873)
1971 – Arne Jacobsen, Danish architect, designed the Radisson Blu Royal Hotel and Aarhus City Hall (b. 1902)
  1971   – Arthur Metcalfe, Australian public servant (b. 1895)
1973 – Bertram Stevens, Australian accountant and politician, 25th Premier of New South Wales (b. 1889)
1976 – Bernard Montgomery, 1st Viscount Montgomery of Alamein, English field marshal (b. 1887)
1978 – Park Mok-wol, influential Korean poet and academic (b. 1916)
1980 – Óscar Romero, Salvadoran archbishop (b. 1917)
1984 – Sam Jaffe, American actor (b. 1891)
1988 – Turhan Feyzioğlu, Turkish academic and politician, 27th Deputy Prime Minister of Turkey (b. 1922)
1990 – Ray Goulding, American comedian and radio host (b. 1922)
1991 – John Kerr, Australian lawyer and politician, 18th Governor-General of Australia (b. 1914)
1993 – Albert Arlen, Australian pianist, composer, actor, and playwright (b. 1905)
  1993   – John Hersey, American journalist and author (b. 1914)
1995 – Joseph Needham, English historian and academic (b. 1900)
1999 – Gertrud Scholtz-Klink, German politician (b. 1902)
  1999   – Birdie Tebbetts, American baseball player and manager (b. 1912)
2001 – Muriel Young, English television host and producer (b. 1928)
2002 – César Milstein, Argentinian-English biochemist and academic, Nobel Prize laureate (b. 1927)
  2002   – Bob Said, American race car driver and bobsledder (b. 1932)
2003 – Hans Hermann Groër, Austrian cardinal (b. 1919)
2006 – Rudra Rajasingham, Sri Lankan police officer and diplomat (b. 1926)
2007 – Shripad Narayan Pendse, Indian Marathi novelist (b. 1913)
2008 – Chalmers Alford, American guitarist (b. 1955)
  2008   – Neil Aspinall, Welsh-English record producer and manager (b. 1941)
  2008   – Rafael Azcona, Spanish author and screenwriter (b. 1926)
  2008   – Richard Widmark, American actor (b. 1914)
2009 – George Kell, American baseball player and sportscaster (b. 1922)
  2009   – Hans Klenk, German racing driver (b. 1919)
  2009   – Gábor Ocskay, Hungarian ice hockey player (b. 1975)
2010 – Robert Culp, American actor (b. 1930)
  2010   – Jim Marshall, American photographer (b. 1936)
2012 – Paul Callaghan, New Zealand physicist and academic (b. 1947)
  2012   – Nick Noble, American singer-songwriter (b. 1926)
2013 – Barbara Anderson, New Zealand author (b. 1926)
  2013   – Inge Lønning, Norwegian theologian, academic, and politician (b. 1938)
  2013   – Gury Marchuk, Russian physicist, mathematician, and academic (b. 1925)
  2013   – Paolo Ponzo, Italian footballer (b. 1972)
  2013   – Mohamed Yousri Salama, Egyptian dentist and politician (b. 1974)
  2013   – Francis Hovell-Thurlow-Cumming-Bruce, 8th Baron Thurlow, English diplomat (b. 1912)
2014 – Oleksandr Muzychko, Ukrainian activist (b. 1962)
  2014   – John Rowe Townsend, English author and scholar (b. 1922)
  2014   – David A. Trampier, American illustrator (b. 1954)
2015 – Yehuda Avner, English-Israeli diplomat (b. 1928)
  2015   – notable deaths of the Germanwings Flight 9525 crash:
Oleg Bryjak, Kazakhstani-German opera singer (b. 1960)
Maria Radner, German opera singer (b. 1981)
2016 – Johan Cruyff, Dutch footballer (b. 1947)
  2016   – Garry Shandling, American comedian, actor, and screenwriter (b. 1949)
2018 – Lys Assia, Swiss singer and First Winner of the Eurovision Song Contest (b. 1924)
  2018   – Rim Banna, Palestinian singer, composer, arranger and activist (b. 1966)
2019 – Joseph Pilato, American film and voice actor (b. 1949)
2020 – Albert Uderzo, French comic book artist (b. 1927)
  2020   – Manu Dibango, Cameroonian musician and songwriter (b. 1933)
2021 – Jessica Walter, American actress and voice artist (b. 1941)
2022 – Dagny Carlsson, Swedish blogger and influencer (b. 1912)

Holidays and observances
Christian feast day:
Catherine of Vadstena
Hildelith of Barking
Mac Cairthinn of Clogher
Óscar Romero (Catholic Church, Anglican Communion, Lutheranism)
Paul Couturier (Church of England)
Walter Hilton (Church of England)
March 24 (Eastern Orthodox liturgics)
Day of Remembrance for Truth and Justice (Argentina)
International Day for the Right to the Truth Concerning Gross Human Rights Violations and for the Dignity of Victims
National Tree Planting Day (Uganda)
Student Day (Scientology) 
World Tuberculosis Day (International)

References

External links

BBC: On This Day

Historical Events on March 24

Days of the year
March